This is a list of all the Royal Navy Fleet Air Arm groups that were formed. There were Carrier Air Groups which administered squadrons which operated on carriers and Training Air Groups which administered squadrons that operated from land bases.

Carrier Air Groups

1st Carrier Air Group - formed on 30 June 1945. It was based on the aircraft carrier  for service in the British Pacific Fleet and comprised 849 Naval Air Squadron flying the Grumman TBF Avenger, 1834 Naval Air Squadron and 1836 Naval Air Squadron flying the Vought F4U Corsair. It was disbanded on 8 September 1945 when Victorious returned to the United Kingdom.
2nd Carrier Air Group - formed on 30 June 1945. It was based on the aircraft carrier  for service in the British Pacific Fleet and contained 848 Naval Air Squadron flying the TBF Avenger, 1841 Naval Air Squadron and 1842 Naval Air Squadron flying the F4U Corsair. It was disbanded on 31 October 1945 when Formidable returned to the United Kingdom.
3rd Carrier Air Group - formed on 2 August 1945. It was a spare air group for the British Pacific Fleet based at Nowra. It was formed too late for service in the war, and it contained 854 Naval Air Squadron flying the TBF Avenger, 1843 Naval Air Squadron and 1845 Naval Air Squadron flying the F4U Corsair. It was disbanded on 20 October 1945, and its personnel returned to the United Kingdom on board a merchant ship.
7th Carrier Air Group - formed on 30 June 1945. It was based on the aircraft carrier  for service in the British Pacific Fleet and contained 820 Naval Air Squadron flying the TBF Avenger, 887 Naval Air Squadron and 894 Naval Air Squadron flying the Supermarine Seafire and 1770 Naval Air Squadron flying the Fairey Firefly. It was disbanded in March 1946.
8th Carrier Air Group - formed on 30 June 1945. It was based on the aircraft carrier  for service in the British Pacific Fleet and contained 828 Naval Air Squadron flying the TBF Avenger, 801 Naval Air Squadron and 880 Naval Air Squadron flying the Supermarine Seafire and 1771 Naval Air Squadron flying the Fairey Firefly. It was disbanded in April 1946, but some of its squadrons disbanded earlier.
11th Carrier Air Group - formed on 30 June 1945. It was based on the aircraft carrier  for service in the British Pacific Fleet and contained 857 Naval Air Squadron flying the TBF Avenger, 1839 Naval Air Squadron and 1844 Naval Air Squadron flying the F6F Hellcat. It was disbanded on 30 November 1945.
13th Carrier Air Group - formed on 30 June 1945. It was based on the aircraft carrier  for service in the British Pacific Fleet and contained 812 Naval Air Squadron flying the Fairey Barracuda and 1850 Naval Air Squadron flying the F4U Corsair. It was disbanded in August 1946.
14th Carrier Air Group - formed on 30 June 1945. It was based on the aircraft carrier HMS Colossus for service in the British Pacific Fleet and contained 827 Naval Air Squadron flying the Fairey Barracuda and 1846 Naval Air Squadron flying the F4U Corsair. It was disbanded on 23 July 1946.
15th Carrier Air Group - formed on 30 June 1945. It was based on the aircraft carrier  for service in the British Pacific Fleet and contained 814 Naval Air Squadron flying the Fairey Barracuda and 1851 Naval Air Squadron flying the F4U Corsair. It was disbanded in 1947.
16th Carrier Air Group - formed on 30 June 1945. It was based on the aircraft carrier  for service in the British Pacific Fleet and contained 837 Naval Air Squadron flying the Fairey Barracuda and 1831 Naval Air Squadron flying the F4U Corsair. It was disbanded in 1947.

During the Second World War the creation of a 4th, 5th, 9th, 12th and 22nd Carrier Air Group also was planned. The surrender of Japan rendered the new carrier air groups unnecessary, and they were never formed.

Other Air Groups

 50th Training Air Group - formed at RNAS Yeovilton on 13 May 1948. Administered second line units at Yeovilton including 700 Naval Air Squadron (until August 1949), 767 Naval Air Squadron (until January 1952) and 799 Naval Air Squadron (until December 1951). It was disbanded during January 1952.
 51st Training Air Group - Formed at RNAS Eglinton during May 1946. Administered second line units at Eglinton such as 718 Naval Air Squadron and 719 Naval Air Squadron. It was disbanded on 13 November 1946.
 51st Miscellaneous Air Group - Formed at RNAS Lee-on-Solent during July 1948. Administered 771 Naval Air Squadron and 783 Naval Air Squadron at Lee-on-Solent. Disbanded during 1950.
 52nd Training Air Group - Formed at RNAS Eglinton. Administered 718, 794 and 795 Naval Air Squadrons at Eglinton. Disbanded during March 1947. Reformed at RNAS Culdrose on 1 February 1950. Administered 736 and 738 Naval Air Squadrons. Disbanded there on 16 August 1951.
 53rd Training Air Group - formed at Eglinton on 14 June 1950. Administered 719 and 737 Naval Air Squadrons. Disbanded there on 31 January 1952.

References

Citations

Bibliography

 
Fleet Air Arm Groups